Along Came Daffy is a 1947 Warner Bros. Looney Tunes cartoon directed by Friz Freleng and written by Michael Maltese and Tedd Pierce. The cartoon was released on June 14, 1947, and stars Daffy Duck and Yosemite Sam.

Along Came Daffy is one of only two Warner Bros. shorts (the other being 1962's Honey's Money) in which Yosemite Sam is not paired with  Bugs Bunny. (At one point, Daffy does imitate "carrot chewing" and ask, "Eh, what's cookin', Doc?", a variant of Bugs's "What's up, Doc?" catchphrase.)

The cartoon reused the scenario of two characters trying to eat Daffy from the 1942 black-and-white short Daffy's Southern Exposure from a different point of view, which was directed by animator Norman McCabe.

Plot
Yosemite Sam and his black-haired twin brother are starving in a snowbound cabin. In a scene reminiscent of 1943's Wackiki Wabbit, the two hungry men start to hallucinate and see each other as food due to extreme starvation.

Daffy Duck turns up as a door-to-door salesman. Upon realizing he is a duck, the two Sams chase Daffy all over the cabin, to try to turn him into a duck dinner. Eventually Daffy is able to explain that he is selling cookbooks, and happens to have a complimentary turkey dinner with all the trimmings  in his sample case. He lays out the spread and makes a quick exit as the famished Sams sit down to eat.

Before the two Sams can take a bite, a horde of hungry mice dash from out of the woodwork and strip the turkey clean in a few seconds. At the point of despair, they hear another knock on the door. Daffy is there again, offering some after-dinner mints. The two Sams grab him and pull him inside. Daffy is able to stick his head out the door for a moment and tell the audience, "Well, here we go again!" He then gets yanked back inside and the door closes to a black-out that ends the cartoon.

See also
List of Daffy Duck cartoons
List of Yosemite Sam cartoons
Looney Tunes and Merrie Melodies filmography

References

External links

1947 animated films
1947 short films
Looney Tunes shorts
Warner Bros. Cartoons animated short films
Short films directed by Friz Freleng
Daffy Duck films
Films scored by Carl Stalling
1940s Warner Bros. animated short films
Yosemite Sam films
Films with screenplays by Michael Maltese
Films about twin brothers
1940s English-language films
American animated short films
Films about ducks
Animated films about birds
Animated films about brothers
Films about salespeople
Starvation